The 505 Dundas is a Toronto streetcar route run by the Toronto Transit Commission in Ontario, Canada. The route is roughly U-shaped running mainly along Dundas Street between Dundas West and Broadview stations several blocks south of the Line 2 Bloor–Danforth subway.

Route
The route starts at Dundas West station on subway Line 2 Bloor–Danforth and goes south along Dundas Street West. The street curves southeast and passes Howard Park. It then passes over a bridge for the main Canadian National Railways line that runs down to Union Station. To the east of the bridge, past Lansdowne Avenue, it continues in a roughly southeast direction before turning eastward at Ossington Avenue. Downtown, the route passes subway Line 1 Yonge–University at two stations: St. Patrick station at University Avenue and Dundas station at Yonge Street. It continues east towards Broadview Avenue where it turns north. The route ends at Broadview station on Line 2 Bloor–Danforth.

The route operates seven days a week from early morning to after midnight. During weekday rush hours, daytime and early evenings, average service frequency is 5 to 7 minutes. Saturday daytime services have an average frequency of 5 to7 minutes with Sunday daytime service frequency averaging 6 to 8 minutes.

History
Just prior to 1966, the east and west ends of Dundas Street were covered by separate streetcar routes. Dundas Street West was served by the pre-1966 Dundas streetcar route running from the Runnymede Loop at Runnymede Road to the City Hall Loop south of Bay and Dundas streets. Dundas Street East was served by part of the now-defunct Harbord streetcar line between Broadview Avenue and Spadina Avenue. The two routes overlapped between Bay Street and Spadina Avenue.

When subway Line 2 Bloor–Danforth opened in 1966, the Harbord streetcar route was abandoned, and the Dundas streetcar route was extended eastward onto Dundas Street East and then north on Broadview Avenue to terminate at Broadview station. At the west end of the line, the Dundas streetcar still operated to the Runnymede Loop passing through Dundas West station in both directions. There was still a branch to the City Hall Loop where every second eastbound Dundas streetcar used to terminate and turn back.

In 1968, the section of the Dundas streetcar line between Dundas West station and the Runnymede Loop was replaced by the 40 Junction bus. Now, except for the branch to the City Hall Loop, the Dundas route became the same as today's 505 Dundas route.

On January 6, 1975, the City Hall Loop was closed due to construction of the Eaton Centre. Any downtown short-turning of eastbound Dundas streetcars was around an on-street loop: south on Church Street, west on Queen Street, north on Victoria Street then west on Dundas Street.

On February 18, 2018, the route began being operated with buses instead of streetcars due to a streetcar shortage and to reassign streetcars in order to address crowding on other routes. Streetcar service was originally expected to return on March 29, 2020, but was delayed to complete upgrades to the overhead infrastructure for pantograph operation. On April 20, 2020, Flexity Outlook streetcars went into service on 505 Dundas on the same day that streetcars were withdrawn from 511 Bathurst due to construction projects.

Following controversy over the namesake of Dundas Street, Henry Dundas, 1st Viscount Melville, who delayed the abolition of the transatlantic slave trade, Toronto City Council voted in 2021 to rename Dundas Street and other civic assets named after Dundasincluding the 505 Dundas streetcar route. A new name will be chosen in April 2022.

Sites along the line
From west to east:
Kensington Market
 Chinatown at Spadina Avenue
 Art Gallery of Ontario
 Yonge–Dundas Square and Toronto Eaton Centre
 East Chinatown at Gerrard Street

References

External links

 Toronto Transit Commission official site
 TTC route page for 505 Dundas
 505 Dundas Route (Transit Toronto)
 

Streetcar routes in Toronto
4 ft 10⅞ in gauge railways